Andy Jones (born June 28, 1994) is an American football wide receiver who is a free agent. He played college football at Jacksonville University.

Early years
Jones attended East Ridge High School, where he played as a wide receiver and became a starter until his senior season. After graduation he enrolled at Division I-AA Jacksonville University, which was a part of the non-athletic-scholarship Pioneer Football League.

He became a starter as a sophomore, registering 31 receptions (third on the team) for 457 yards (14.7-yard average per catch) and 2 touchdowns in 11 games (8 starts). The next year, he had 46 receptions (tied for the team lead) for 684 yards (led the team) and 7 touchdowns.

As a senior, he led the team with 60 receptions for 890 yards and 8 touchdowns. He finished his college career with 144 receptions for 2,120 yards and 17 touchdowns.

Professional career

Dallas Cowboys
On May 6, 2016, Jones was signed as an undrafted free agent by the Dallas Cowboys, after a strong showing at the University of Florida's Pro Day. Taking advantage that Dez Bryant was still recuperating from previous injuries, he was able to use the extra practice time to have some notable performances in training camp. Unfortunately, he couldn't translate that production into the preseason games and was waived on September 3, 2016 and was signed to the practice squad the next day. After spending his entire rookie season on the practice squad, Jones signed a reserve/future contract with the Cowboys on January 17, 2017.

In training camp in 2017, Jones was passed on the depth chart by rookie wide receiver Noah Brown and was waived on September 2, 2017.

Houston Texans
On September 3, 2017, Jones was claimed off waivers by the Houston Texans, who had scouted him when they were forced by the aftermath of Hurricane Harvey to spend three days practicing in the Dallas Cowboys' facilities. The Texans acquired him to improve their depth, after having only four receivers on the roster and knowing that Will Fuller was going to miss 3 games while recovering from a broken collarbone. He appeared in his first NFL career game against the Jacksonville Jaguars. He was waived on September 13 and later re-signed to the active roster on September 18. He was passed on the depth chart by rookie Chris Thompson and was released on September 27, 2017.

Detroit Lions
On September 30, 2017, Jones was signed to the Detroit Lions' practice squad. He was promoted to the active roster on December 19, 2017.

On September 1, 2018, Jones was placed on the physically unable to perform list to start the season. He was activated off PUP on November 3, 2018, but was waived two days later and re-signed to the practice squad. He was promoted to the active roster on November 17, 2018. He made his first career NFL reception on November 22 during the Thanksgiving day game against the Chicago Bears. He got his first touchdown reception on December 16 against the Bills.

On August 31, 2019, Jones was waived/injured by the Lions and placed on injured reserve. He was waived from injured reserve with an injury settlement on September 2.

Miami Dolphins
On September 25, 2019, Jones was signed to the Miami Dolphins practice squad. He was released on November 1. On November 20, 2019, Jones was re-signed to their practice squad. He signed a futures contract with the team on December 31, 2019.

On April 18, 2020, Jones was waived by the Dolphins. Jones re-signed with the Dolphins on August 31, 2020. He was waived again on September 5, 2020.

San Francisco 49ers
On June 1, 2021, Jones signed with the San Francisco 49ers. On July 27, Jones was waived by San Francisco.

New York Giants
On August 4, 2021, Jones signed with the New York Giants, but was waived four days later.

References

External links
 Houston Texans bio
 Jacksonville Dolphins bio

1994 births
Living people
People from Clermont, Florida
Players of American football from Florida
Sportspeople from Lake County, Florida
American football wide receivers
Jacksonville Dolphins football players
Dallas Cowboys players
Houston Texans players
Detroit Lions players
Miami Dolphins players
San Francisco 49ers players
New York Giants players